The Secretary is a 1938 Hindi-language Indian comedy film directed by Chaturbhuj Doshi. The film was produced by Chandulal Shah under the Ranjit Pictures banner. The music was provided by Gyan Dutt with lyrics by Pyare Lal Santoshi. The main cast was Noor Mohammed Charlie, Trilok Kapoor, Madhuri, Kalyani Das, Waheedan Bai and Rajkumari.

The film is about an heiress, played by Madhuri, who falls in love with her father's secretary played by Trilok Kapoor.

Cast
 Madhuri
 Trilok Kapoor
 Charlie
 Kalyani
 Wahidan Bai
 Rajkumari

Debut direction
According to Narwekar, Secretary was the first film Doshi directed after having worked for Ranjit Studios as a scriptwriter since 1929. However, as cited by Filmindia and Rajadhyaksha and Willemen, this was reportedly his second film, with Gorakh Aaya which was also made the same year, being his first. The film was a bilingual being made in Hindi and Gujarati. Doshi, thus laid the groundwork for Gujarati film production along with his other films like Gunsundari.

Soundtrack

References

External links

1938 comedy films
1930s Hindi-language films
1938 films
Films scored by Gyan Dutt
Indian black-and-white films
Indian comedy films
Hindi-language comedy films
Films directed by Chaturbhuj Doshi